The Matriarch Stakes is a Victoria Racing Club Group 2 Thoroughbred horse race for mares aged four years old and upwards, run at set weights with penalties, over a distance of 2,000 metres, held annually at Flemington Racecourse, Melbourne, Australia in November on the last day of the VRC Spring Carnival.  Total prize money for the race is A$300,000.

History

Grade
 1995–2000 - Listed Race
 2001–2004 - Group 3
 2005  -  onwards Group 2

Name
 1995–2004 - Matriarch Stakes
 2005–2007 - Hilton International Stakes
 2008–2012 - Matriarch Stakes
 2013–2014 - Momentum Energy Stakes
 2015 - Matriarch Stakes

Winners

 2022 - Atishu
 2021 - Zayydani
 2020 - Affair To Remember
 2019 - Oceanex
 2018 - Kenedna
 2017 - Savapinski
 2016 - Jessy Belle
 2015 - Lucia Valentina
 2014 - Suavito
 2013 - Girl Gone Rockin'
 2012 - Midnight Martini
 2011 - Vintedge
 2010 - Well Rounded
 2009 - Purple
 2008 - Bird Of Fire
 2007 - Hidden Strings
 2006 - Brom Felinity
 2005 - Sutology
 2004 - Demerger
 2003 - Sweet Corn
 2002 - Damaschino
 2001 - Piper Star
 2000 - Flushed
 1999 - Sly Sandra
 1998 - Laebeel
 1997 - Battocchi
 1996 - Gold City
 1995 - Magical Storm
 1994 - Sudden Wonder
 1993 - Gilded Splendor

See also
Thoroughbred racing in Australia
Melbourne Spring Racing Carnival
 VRC Stakes day
 List of Australian Group races
 Group races

References

Horse races in Australia
Flemington Racecourse